Julie Harris (1925–2013) was an American actress

Julie Harris may also refer to:

 Julie Harris (costume designer) (1921–2015), British costume designer
 Julie Harris (cricketer) (born 1960), New Zealand cricketer
 Julie M. Harris (born 1967), Professor at the University of St Andrews
 Patsy Palmer (born 1972), English actress whose birth name was Julie Anne Harris
 Juliet “JuJu” Harris American chef

See also
 Julia Harris (disambiguation)